Teduglutide (brand names Gattex in the US and Revestive in Europe) is a 33-membered polypeptide and glucagon-like peptide-2 (GLP-2) analog that is used for the treatment of short bowel syndrome. It works by promoting mucosal growth and possibly restoring gastric emptying and secretion.  In Europe it has been granted orphan drug status and is marketed under the brand Revestive by Nycomed. It was approved by the United States under the name Gattex on 21 December 2012, where it was given status as an orphan drug.

Medical uses
Up to a certain point, the gut can adapt to partial resections that result in short bowel syndrome. Still, parenteral substitution of water, minerals and vitamins (depending on which part of the gut has been removed) is often necessary. Teduglutide may reduce or shorten the necessity of such infusions by improving the intestinal mucosa and possibly by other mechanisms.

Adverse effects
Common adverse effects in clinical studies included abdominal discomfort (49% of patients), respiratory infections (28%), nausea (27%) and vomiting (14%), local reactions at the injection site (21%), and headache (17%).

Chemistry and mechanism of action
Teduglutide differs from natural GLP-2 by a single amino acid: an alanine is replaced with a glycine. This blocks breaking down of the molecule by dipeptidyl peptidase and increases its half-life from seven minutes (GLP-2) to about two hours, while retaining its biological actions. These include maintenance of the intestinal mucosa, increasing intestinal blood flow, reducing gastrointestinal motility and secretion of gastric acid.

References 

Drugs acting on the gastrointestinal system and metabolism
Orphan drugs
Peptides
Takeda Pharmaceutical Company brands